Love Is Forever is the fourth album by London indie pop band Biff Bang Pow! released in 1988.<ref name="Discogs.com">[http://www.discogs.com/Biff-Bang-Pow-Love-Is-Forever/release/1014157 Biff Bang Pow! on Discogs.com]</ref>

Track listing
Side AMiss California Toothpaste 1972 - (03:39)She Haunts - (02:47)Searching For The Pavement - (02:56)She Paints - (05:21)Close - (03:25)
Side BIce Cream Machine - (04:06)Electric Sugar Child - (03:28)Dark In Mind - (03:14)Startripper - (02:45)She Went Away To The Love'' - (01:47)

Personnel
Edward Ball - backing vocals
Philip King - bass
Richard Green - guitar, acoustic guitar
Andrew Blake - harmonica
Joss Cope - organ
Ken Popple - percussion
Alan McGee - vocals, guitar, acoustic guitar

References

1988 albums
Biff Bang Pow! albums